Otterøya is an island in the municipality of Namsos in Trøndelag county, Norway. The  island is the largest island in the northern part of Trøndelag county.  Otterøya sits just to the northwest of the town of Namsos on the north side of the Namsenfjorden.  It is connected to the mainland by the Lokkaren Bridge. The island was once governed by the municipalities of Otterøy and Fosnes, and became a part of the municipality of Namsos in 1964. Otterøy Church is located on the island.

Notable residents
Idar Lind (born 1954), Norwegian writer

See also
List of islands of Norway by area
List of islands of Norway

References

Islands of Trøndelag
Namsos